Keats Rides a Harley was a compilation-EP released in 1981 on the Happy Squid label. It was re-released in 2005 with 14 extra tracks.

Track listing

Original album

 The Earwigs - "A Martyr is Made" (Kerns/Turkle/Underhill/Willard) - 2:32
 Toxic Shock - "Sensationalism" (Anderson/Ziegler) - 1:25
 S Squad - "Scene of the Crime" (Saffery/Stolze) - 2:37
 The Gun Club - Devil in the Woods" (Jeffrey Lee Pierce) - 3:22
 Meat Puppets - "H-Elenore" (Curt Kirkwood) - 1:40
 The Leaving Trains - "Virginia City" (Manfred Hofer/James "Falling James" Moreland) - 2:12
 Tunneltones - "Is This a Restart?" (Erskine/Licher/Spinelli/Voznick) - 1:39
 Human Hands - "Hypnotica" (Human Hands) - 4:01
 100 Flowers - "Salmonella" (Johansen/Jones) - 2:23

CD Reissue

 The Earwigs - "A Martyr is Made" (Kerns/Turkle/Underhill/Willard) - 2:32
 Toxic Shock - "Sensationalism" (Anderson/Ziegler) - 1:25
 S Squad - "Scene of the Crime" (Saffery/Stolze) - 2:37
 The Gun Club - Devil in the Woods" (Jeffrey Lee Pierce) - 3:22
 Meat Puppets - "H-Elenore" (Curt Kirkwood) - 1:40
 The Leaving Trains - "Virginia City" (Tom Hofer/James "Falling James" Moreland) - 2:12
 Tunneltones - "Is This a Restart?" (Erskine/Licher/Spinelli/Voznick) - 1:39
 Human Hands - "Hypnotica" (Human Hands) - 4:01
 100 Flowers - "Salmonella" (Johansen/Jones) - 2:23
 The Earwigs - "Freedom" (Kerns/Turkle/Underhill/Willard) - 2:47
 Toxic Shock - "Fat" (Anderson/Ziegler) - 1:33
 S Squad - "Virgins" (Stolze) - 3:36
 The Gun Club - "Preaching Blues" (Jeffrey Lee Pierce) - 4:34
 Meat Puppets - "The Losing End" (Neil Young) - 3:42
 The Leaving Trains - "Cigarette Motel" (James "Falling James" Moreland) - 1:26
 Tunneltones - "Happyland" (Erskine/Gross/Licher/Spinelli/Voznick) - 3:31
 Human Hands - "Jimmy Loop" (Human Hands) - 5:51
 100 Flowers - "Sensible Virgins" (Jones) - 1:16
 Urinals - "U" (Johansen/Jones) - 0:39
 Danny and the Doorknobs - "Melody" (Hinge) - 2:19
 Arrow Book Club - "Get Down, Part 4" (Arrow Book Club) - 1:35
 Vidiots - "Laurie's Lament" (Murphy/Windfield) - 1:41
 Phil Bedel - "Caterpillar Stomp" (Phil Bedel) - 0:49

References 

1981 compilation albums
Rock compilation albums